Luis Arrieta (born 23 July 1982), is a Mexican film actor, television actor producer, director and writer.

Filmography

References

External links 

1982 births
Mexican male film actors
Mexican male telenovela actors
Male actors from Mexico City
21st-century Mexican male actors
Living people